Zophodia is a genus of snout moths in the subfamily Phycitinae. It was erected by Jacob Hübner in 1825.

Species
 Zophodia epischnioides Hulst, 1900
 Zophodia grossulariella (Hübner, 1809)
 Zophodia multistriatella (A. Blanchard & Knudson, 1982)

Taxonomy
The genera Alberada, Cactobrosis, Eremberga, Ozamia, Tucumania, Yosemitia and Melitara are included in Zophodia by some authors. If these are accepted as synonyms, a large number of species is added to the genus:
 Zophodia analamprella Dyar, 1922
 Zophodia apicigrammella (A. Blanchard & Knudson, 1985)
 Zophodia asthenosoma (Dyar, 1919)
 Zophodia bidentella Dyar, 1908
 Zophodia brevistrigella Ragonot, 1888
 Zophodia chilensis (Heinrich, 1939)
 Zophodia creabates (Dyar, 1923)
 Zophodia dentata Grote, 1876
 Zophodia didactica (Dyar, 1914)
 Zophodia doddalis (Dyar, 1925)
 Zophodia ebeniella (Ragonot, 1888)
 Zophodia fernaldialis (Hulst, 1886)
 Zophodia fieldiella Dyar, 1913
 Zophodia fuscomaculella (Wright, 1916)
 Zophodia graciella (Hulst, 1887)
 Zophodia hemilutella (Dyar, 1922)
 Zophodia holochlora Dyar, 1925
 Zophodia huanucensis (Heinrich, 1939)
 Zophodia immorella (Dyar, 1913)
 Zophodia insignatella (Dyar, 1914)
 Zophodia insignis (Heinrich, 1939)
 Zophodia junctolineella (Hulst, 1900)
 Zophodia leithella (Dyar, 1928)
 Zophodia leuconips (Dyar, 1925)
 Zophodia lignea de Joannis, 1927
 Zophodia longipennella (Hampson, 1901)
 Zophodia lucidalis (Walker, 1863)
 Zophodia maculifera (Dyar, 1914)
 Zophodia nephelepasa (Dyar, 1919)
 Zophodia parabates (Dyar, 1913)
 Zophodia pectinatella (Hampson in Ragonot, 1901)
 Zophodia penari Roesler & Küppers, 1981
 Zophodia phryganoides (Walker, 1857)
 Zophodia porrecta (Dyar, 1925)
 Zophodia prodenialis (Walker, 1863)
 Zophodia punicans (Heinrich, 1939)
 Zophodia stigmaferella Dyar, 1922
 Zophodia straminea Strand, 1915
 Zophodia subcanella (Zeller, 1848)
 Zophodia substituta (Heinrich, 1939)
 Zophodia subumbrella (Dyar, 1925)
 Zophodia tapiacola (Dyar, 1925)
 Zophodia texana (Neunzig, 1997)
 Zophodia thalassophila (Dyar, 1925)
 Zophodia transilis (Heinrich, 1939)

References

Phycitini
Pyralidae genera